The Old Gum Tree (also known as The Proclamation Tree) is a historic site in Glenelg North, South Australia. Near this tree on 28 December 1836, the British governor John Hindmarsh delivered the proclamation announcing the establishment of Government of the colony of South Australia.  A ceremony is held each year at the site on Proclamation Day, with the current Governor reading out Hindmarsh's original speech.

The tree itself, probably a red gum, had died by 1907. Its decayed outer surface was encased in concrete in 1963.   

It was listed on the now-defunct Register of the National Estate in 1978 and listed on the South Australian Heritage Register in 1980.



See also
Holdfast Bay
List of Adelaide parks and gardens
List of named Eucalyptus trees
List of individual trees
Proclamation Day

References

Further reading

External links
MAPCO's Old Adelaide Photos. Photo of Proclamation Tree, Adelaide. c1880.

History of Adelaide
Tourist attractions in Adelaide
Landmarks in Australia
Individual eucalypts
Individual trees in South Australia
South Australian Heritage Register
South Australian places listed on the defunct Register of the National Estate